Vincentio (Vincenzio, Vincenzo) Reinieri (Renieri, Reiner) (30 March 1606 – 5 November 1647) was an Italian mathematician and astronomer. He was a friend and disciple of Galileo Galilei.

Biography

Born at Genoa, he was a member of the Olivetan order. His order sent him to Rome in 1623. He met Galileo at Siena in 1633. Galileo had Reinieri update and attempt to improve his astronomical tables of the motions of Jupiter's moons, revising these tables for prediction of the positions of these satellites.

Reinieri's work led him to Arcetri, where he befriended Vincenzo Viviani. Reinieri enjoyed the same spirit of inquiry and love of debate as his mentor. On 5 February 1641 Reinieri wrote to Galileo from Pisa: "Not infrequently I am in some battle with the Peripatetic gentlemen, particularly when I note that those fattest with ignorance least appreciate your worth, and I have just given the head of one of those a good scrubbing." (Drake, p. 413-4)

Reinieri became professor of mathematics at the University of Pisa on the death of Dino Peri. He also taught Greek there. His astronomical work consisted of adding new observations of Jupiter's moons to Galileo's. To some degree, Reinieri improved the Galilean tables on the motions of these satellites. Before his death, Galileo decided to place all of the papers containing his observations and calculations in the hands of Reinieri. Reinieri was to finish and revise them.

Reinieri's observations of Jupiter's moons remained unpublished at the time of his premature death at Pisa in 1647. He was succeeded to the chair of mathematics by Famiano Michelini (c. 1600-1666).

Legacy

On Reinieri's death, papers concerning longitude entrusted to him by Galileo are said to have been stolen by a man named Giuseppe Agostini (Fahie, p. 374). However, scholars such as Antonio Favaro doubt whether this theft actually occurred (see Antonio Favaro, Documenti inediti per la Storia dei MSS. Galileiani, Rome, 1886, pp. 8–14).

The crater Reiner on the Moon is named after him.

Latin works

Expugnata Hierusalem, poema, Publisher: Maceratae, Apud Petrum Salvionum (1628) 
Tabulae mediceae secundorum mobilium universales quibus per unicum prosthaphaereseon orbis canonem planetarum calculus exhibetur. Non solum tychonicè iuxta Rudolphinas Danicas & Lansbergianas, sed etiam iuxta Prutenicas Alphonsinas & Ptolemaicas, Publisher: Florentiae, typis nouis Amatoris Massae & Laurentij de Landis (1639) 
 
Tabulæ motuum cælestium universales : serenissimi magni ducis etruriæ Ferdinandi II. auspicijs primo editæ, & Mediceæ nuncupati, nunc vero auctæ, recognitæ, atque... Bernardini Fernandez de Velasco... iussu, ac sumptibus recusæ...Publisher: Florentiæ : typis Amatoris Massæ Foroliuien., 1647

Sources
Drake, Stillman, Galileo at Work: His Scientific Biography (Chicago: University of Chicago Press, 1978), 464. 
Fahie, J.J., Galileo: His Life and Work (London: John Murray, 1903), 374-5. - Google Books

Further reading
A Selection from Italian Prose Writers: with a double translation: for the use of students of the Italian language on the Hamiltonian system, London, Hunt and Clark, 1828 - Google Books. Letters of Galileo to Renieri: pp. 142–147 (no images for remainder of letter), and pp. 242–253 (no images pp, 246-250).

1606 births
1647 deaths
17th-century Genoese people
17th-century Italian mathematicians
17th-century Italian writers
17th-century Italian male writers
17th-century Italian astronomers
Olivetan Order
Catholic clergy scientists
Academic staff of the University of Pisa
Scientists from Genoa